The Market Street Terminal was a station on the Chicago "L"'s Lake Street Elevatedtoday part of the Green Linebetween 1893 and 1948. The Elevated's original downtown terminus, it opened at the corner of Madison Street and Market Street (modern-day Wacker Drive) on November 6, 1893, alongside the rest of the Elevated. When the Loop was constructed in 1895, the Terminal was required to be demolished but no action was taken. When it closed in 1948, only overflow traffic served it. It was demolished shortly thereafter for the construction of double-decked Wacker Drive.

See also
Stub terminals of the Chicago "L"

References

Defunct Chicago "L" stations